The 1958 Marshall Thundering Herd football team was an American football team that represented Marshall University in the Mid-American Conference (MAC) during the 1958 NCAA College Division football season. In its sixth season under head coach Herb Royer, the team compiled a 3–6 record (1–5 against conference opponents), finished in seventh place out of seven teams in the MAC, and was outscored by a total of 165 to 111. Vernon Howell and Sonny Sirianni were the team captains. The team played its home games at Fairfield Stadium in Huntington, West Virginia.

Schedule

References

Marshall
Marshall Thundering Herd football seasons
Marshall Thundering Herd football